"She's a River" is the first single released from Scottish rock band Simple Minds' 11th studio album, Good News from the Next World. Written by band members Charlie Burchill and Jim Kerr, the song was inspired by Herman Hesse's novel Siddhartha, a book about self-discovery. Released on 16 January 1995, "She's a River" reached number three in Canada and Italy, number seven in the Flanders region of Belgium, and number nine on the UK Singles Chart. In the United States, it peaked at number six on the Billboard Album Rock Tracks chart.

Background
According to guitarist/keyboardist Charlie Burchill and vocalist Jim Kerr, the song was inspired by Herman Hesse's novel Siddhartha, which contains themes of self-discovery. Kerr explained, "As [a] younger man I relied so much on this book (among many others) to guide me through my own chaos. That need continues, as does the need to have inspirational music driving me on further still." Kerr went on to describe the storyline near the end of the book that inspired him the most:

"She's a River" was the first single released by the band featuring Vinnie Colaiuta on drums. Kerr called his performance "brilliant" and one-of-a-kind.

Chart performance
Released on 16 January 1995, "She's a River" reached number nine on the UK Singles Chart, becoming the band's eighth top-10 hit on that chart, and number five in their native Scotland. Throughout mainland Europe, the song reached number three in Italy, number seven in Flemish Belgium, and the top 40 in several other nations, including Iceland, Ireland, the Netherlands, Sweden, and Switzerland. On the Eurochart Hot 100, it peaked at number 12 during its second week on the chart. In Australasia, "She's a River" reached number 29 in Australia and number 21 in New Zealand.

In Canada, "She's a River" debuted at number 61 on 30 January—the highest debut of the week—and peaked at number three five weeks later, on 13 March. The song stayed on the RPM Top Singles chart for 12 more weeks, and it ended 1995 as Canada's 30th best-selling single. In the United States, the single peaked at number 52 on the Billboard Hot 100, becoming Simple Minds' first hit in the country since "See the Lights", which reached number 40 in 1991. It also reached number six on the Billboard Album Rock Tracks chart, number 10 on the Modern Rock Tracks chart, and number 33 on the Mainstream Top 40.

Track listings

UK CD single
 "She's a River" (edit)
 "She's a River" (instrumental)
 "E 55"

UK cassette and limited-edition 7-inch single
 "She's a River" (edit)
 "E 55"

European and Australian CD single
 "She's a River" (edit)
 "She's a River" (instrumental)
 "E 55"
 "Celtic Strings"

US CD single
 "She's a River" – 4:29
 "She's a River" (LP Version) – 5:32
 "She's a River" (Duo Mix) – 4:25
 "E 55" – 5:07

US cassette single
A1. "She's a River" (edit) – 4:29
A2. "She's a River" (LP Version) – 5:32
B1. "She's a River" (duo mix) – 4:25
B2. "E 55" – 5:07

Charts

Weekly charts

Year-end charts

References

1994 songs
1995 singles
Simple Minds songs
Songs written by Jim Kerr
Songs written by Charlie Burchill
Virgin Records singles